The Legend of Zelda: Symphony of the Goddesses was a concert tour featuring music from Nintendo's The Legend of Zelda video game series. Jason Michael Paul Productions, who was licensed by Nintendo to produce and tour the show, hired Jeron Moore to produce the show as well as Composer Chad Seiter to create the music. The tour is named after the Golden Goddesses in the Zelda series.

Music
The name "Symphony of the Goddesses" refers not only to the concert program but also to the four-movement symphony recounting the storylines from several games in The Legend of Zelda series: A Link to the Past, Ocarina of Time, Twilight Princess, and The Wind Waker. The concert also highlighted orchestral renditions of music from other series games, including Link's Awakening, Majora's Mask, Skyward Sword, and Tri Force Heroes.

Conductors of the concerts have included Eímear Noone, Susie Seiter, Amy Andersson. Kelly Corcoran, Kevin Zakresky and Jessica Gethin.

History

In June 2011, at Nintendo's Electronic Entertainment Expo press event, Jason Michael Paul Productions hired composer Chad Seiter and Producer Jeron Moore to create a four-minute overture spanning 25 years of Zelda music accompanied by images from the same period. After this performance, Shigeru Miyamoto of Nintendo announced that an orchestral CD would accompany the release of Skyward Sword, also produced by Jason Michael Paul Productions with Composer Chad Seiter and recorded by Hollywood recording engineer Bruce Botnick. A 25th Anniversary concert series would be performed in Tokyo, Los Angeles, and London. All of the concerts were produced by Jason Michael Paul Productions.

Evolving from the 25th anniversary concert series, "The Legend of Zelda: Symphony of the Goddesses" concert series kicked off in January 2012 in Dallas, and toured the U.S. and Canada.

The second season, known as "Second Quest" (after a feature found in many Zelda games) consisted of concerts in spring, summer, and fall of 2013. The show went on hiatus after its final "Second Quest" performance in San Jose, California, at the San Jose Civic, performed by the Skywalker Ranch Orchestra.

The third season, known as "Master Quest", consisted of worldwide concerts in 2015 and 2016 and achieved the most success of any of the Zelda Symphony tours traveling to over 150 cities. This continued as the production further iterated until its tour concluded in 2018.

Schedule

Original season
The San Francisco event in March 2012 included over 1000 attendees. The Los Angeles concert in June featured Zelda Williams (daughter of actor Robin Williams) as the emcee. She was named after Princess Zelda, the video game series' titular character. A concert was held in May in Atlanta and was conducted by Susie Seiter.

Second Quest
A concert was held in July 2013 in Baltimore. Concerts were held in August in Newark, New Jersey, September in Seattle, October in Grand Rapids, and December in San Jose, California.

Two concerts were held in Canada: one in Montreal in June and another in Toronto in September. A concert in Mexico City was held in September.

Master Quest
Symphony of the Goddesses started a worldwide 2015 tour of a third season entitled "Master Quest". "Master Quest" season was extended with performance dates through 2016. The extended concert dates featured music and visuals from Tri Force Heroes for the Nintendo 3DS.

† Multiple performances held the same day.

Zelda Symphony of the Goddesses
Symphony of the Goddesses started a new 2017 Worldwide tour season. The five-movement symphony featured an all new movement from Skyward Sword, a much-anticipated arrangement from Breath of the Wild, and a reimagined score including music from A Link Between Worlds, Twilight Princess, the remake of Majora's Mask, Ocarina of Time, A Link to the Past, and more.

Other performances
In September 2015, the Nintendo World Store in New York City hosted a Zelda Symphony event, which consisted of a live musical performance by a string quartet from The Legend of Zelda: Symphony of the Goddesses, an ocarina demo by David Ramos (a.k.a. DocJazz), photo opportunities of cosplaying fans, and Zelda Symphony merchandise. Executive producer Jason Michael Paul and conductor Amy Andersson were also in attendance.

On October 13, The Late Show with Stephen Colbert hosted, as its musical guest, a performance from The Legend of Zelda: Symphony of the Goddesses (with conductor Amy Andersson) to promote the tour dates as well as the release of Tri Force Heroes.

Reception
The series has been well received by the video game press. Writing for The Tech, Jessica Pourian said the silent nature of series protagonist Link worked well with the video displayed during the concert, helping to immerse the audience more than with video game concerts where dialogue is included. She noted extraordinary applause for the concert. She said she left the event wanting to go back and play Zelda games.

Tony Ponce of Destructoid found the music "awe-inspiring", "pure magic", and "as rich and as varied as the games themselves", while expressing a desire to hear some of the music cut from the performance.

Wired noted "many truly breathtaking moments" during the concert, saying the concert highlighted key moments in the music of the series. Wired said people need not even know the series well to enjoy the concert. Wired did complain of "dreadful live camerawork" and noted that the crowd was not particularly reserved.

Stephen Totilo of Kotaku was less enthusiastic about the concert, saying he liked it but did not love it, and criticized the triple-encore structure and the emphasis on battle themes, saying he thought the series was more about adventure than combat.

References

External links
 

2012 concert tours
2013 concert tours
2015 concert tours
Symphony of the Goddesses
Video game concert tours
Nintendo music